Govinda Vidyadhara was the founder of Bhoi Dynasty in Eastern India. He worked as a writer or accountant under Prataprudra Deva. 
According to Anthropologist N. Patnaik, Govinda Vidyadhara was a Khandayat by caste. Historian KC. Panigrahi has ambiguously theorized Bhoi rulers to be of either Gopal or Karana descent. He usurped the throne after the death of Gajapati Prataprudra Deva and took the title of Suvarnakeshari. His rule was short-lived that for seven years only followed by his son Chakrapratap.

References 

History of Odisha
15th-century Indian monarchs
People from Odisha